Cluster Islands are islands on the Ohio River in Hancock County, West Virginia. They are located north of Moscow at the mouth of Tomlinson Run. They have also been known as Neeslys Islands.

See also 
List of islands of West Virginia

River islands of West Virginia
Landforms of Hancock County, West Virginia
Islands of the Ohio River